Carroll Township may refer to:
Carroll Township, Vermilion County, Illinois
Carroll Township, O'Brien County, Iowa
Carroll Township, Tama County, Iowa
Carroll Township, Platte County, Missouri
Carroll Township, Ottawa County, Ohio
Carroll Township, Perry County, Pennsylvania
Carroll Township, Washington County, Pennsylvania
Carroll Township, York County, Pennsylvania